Hamilton North and Bellshill was a constituency of the Scottish Parliament (Holyrood). It elected one Member of the Scottish Parliament (MSP) by the plurality (first past the post) method of election. It was also one of ten constituencies in the Central Scotland electoral region, which elected seven additional members, in addition to ten constituency MSPs, to produce a form of proportional representation for the region as a whole.

For the Scottish Parliament election, 2011, the constituency was significantly redrawn. Two new seats - Hamilton, Larkhall and Stonehouse and Uddingston and Bellshill -  replaced the existing Hamilton North and Bellshill constituency.

Electoral region 
See also Central Scotland Scottish Parliament region

The other nine constituencies of the South of Scotland region between 1999 and 2011 were Airdrie and Shotts, Coatbridge and Chryston, Cumbernauld and Kilsyth, East Kilbride, Falkirk East, Falkirk West, Hamilton South, Kilmarnock and Loudoun and Motherwell and Wishaw.

The region covered all of the Falkirk council area, all of the North Lanarkshire council area, part of the South Lanarkshire council area, part of the East Ayrshire council area and a small part of the East Dumbartonshire council area.

Constituency boundaries and council areas 

The  constituency was created at the same time as the Scottish Parliament, in 1999, with the name and boundaries of an  existing Westminster constituency. In 2005, however, Scottish Westminster (House of Commons) constituencies were mostly replaced with new constituencies.

The Holyrood constituency covered a western portion of the North Lanarkshire council area and a northern portion of the South Lanarkshire council area.

North Lanarkshire council area 

The rest of the North Lanarkshire area was covered by Airdrie and Shotts, Coatbridge and Chryston, Cumbernauld and Kilsyth and Motherwell and Wishaw, which were also within the Central Scotland electoral region.  Coatbridge and Chryston straddled the North Lanarkshire boundary with the East Dunbartonshire council area, which was otherwise within the West of Scotland electoral region.

South Lanarkshire council area 

The rest of the South Lanarkshire area was covered by another four constituencies: East Kilbride and Hamilton South, which were within the Central Scotland region, Glasgow Rutherglen, within the Glasgow region, and Clydesdale, within the South of Scotland region. Glasgow Rutherglen straddled the South Lanarkshire boundary with the Glasgow City council area, which was entirely within the Glasgow electoral region.

Member of the Scottish Parliament

Election results

Notes 

1999 establishments in Scotland
Constituencies established in 1999
2011 disestablishments in Scotland
Constituencies disestablished in 2011
Scottish Parliament constituencies and regions 1999–2011
Hamilton, South Lanarkshire
Bellshill
Bothwell and Uddingston
Politics of South Lanarkshire
Politics of North Lanarkshire